Edström or Edstrom is a surname of Swedish origin. Notable people with the surname include:

Carl-Johan Edström (born 1967), Swedish Air Force major general
Christian Edstrom, Swedish American professional co-driver (rallying) 
Dave Edstrom, American former decathlete 
Ester Edström, Swedish diver who competed in the 1912 Summer Olympics
Kristina Edström, Swedish inorganic specialising in battery technology
Peter David Edstrom (1873–1938), Swedish American sculptor
Ralf Edström, Swedish former footballer
Sigfrid Edström (1870–1964), Swedish industrial and sports official
Sonja Edström, Swedish former cross country skier who competed
Harold and Everett Edstrom, founders of Hal Leonard Corporation

See also
Waggener Edstrom Worldwide, American based privately owned public relations agency

Swedish-language surnames